GE Canada (or General Electric Canada) is the wholly-owned Canadian unit of General Electric, manufacturing various consumer and industrial electrical products all over Canada.

GE Canada was preceded by the company Canadian General Electric (CGE), a Canadian manufacturer of various electrical products which acted as the Canadian counterpart of the American company General Electric. CGE became General Electric Canada in 1989, and is now known as GE Canada.

History

Canadian General Electric Co. Limited (CGE) was incorporated in Canada in 1892 as a merger of Edison Electric Light Company of Canada (of Hamilton, Ontario) and Thomson-Houston Electric Light Company of Canada (of Montreal, Quebec), both incorporated in Canada in 1882.

The Canadian merger occurred in the same year as the merger of parent companies Edison General Electric (of Schenectady, New York) and Thomson-Houston Company (of Lynn, Massachusetts) into General Electric, which continues to the present day as a major international conglomerate.

CGE had about 500 employees at inception and was already producing generators, transformers, motors, wire and cable, and lighting products for consumer and industrial products.

CGE existed as the Canadian counterpart of the American-based General Electric. In 1989, CGE became General Electric Canada, and is now known as GE Canada.

Milestones
General Electric has had a long manufacturing history in Canada, beginning as CGE and existing today as GE Canada:

 1892 — CGE is founded and opens engine/motor plant in Peterborough, Ontario
 1899 — The Canadian General Electric electric car is produced, for model year 1899 only, in Peterborough. The car is essentially a Woods Electric.
 1911 — CGE acquires Sunbeam Lamp Company of Toronto, Ontario.
 1912 — lamp plant is established in Montreal, Quebec.
 1921 — Vacuum tube operations begin in Toronto.
 1922 — Canadian Edison Appliance Company is established.
 1945 — small appliances plant opens in Barrie, Ontario.
 1946 — plastics plant opens in Cobourg, Ontario.
 1946 — lighting plant opens in Oakville, Ontario.
 1947 — electric meter plant opens in Quebec City.
 1971 — The Karachi Nuclear Power Complex, built by CGE, opens.
 1975 — CGE's household appliance division spins off and merges with GSW Inc. (a Canadian manufacturer of household appliances with brands such as McClary, Easy, and Moffat) into a new company named Camco (later known as Mabe Canada).
 1989 — CGE becomes a wholly-owned unit of General Electric, and is renamed General Electric Canada.
 1990s — Electric lamp operations in the Oakville factory slowly begins to get transferred to lamp plants in Warren, Ohio, and Winchester, Virginia (now closed). Most fluorescent tube operations are ceased by the late 1990s.
 2009 — Most incandescent lamp production lines in the Oakville plant are stopped. Production is transferred to Winchester, Virginia.
 2010 — The Oakville lamp plant closes. Remaining incandescent lamp operations are transferred to Mexico and China. A few products are outsourced from Sylvania's US plants. T8 fluorescent tube operations go to Bucyrus, Ohio.
 2018 — planned Peterborough plant shutdown
 2018 — planned reciprocating gas engine plant opening in Welland, Ontario, to replace an existing factory in Waukesha, Wisconsin. The reason for moving to Canada from the US is a lack of export financing from the U.S. Export-Import Bank.

References

Electronics companies of Canada
Canadian subsidiaries of foreign companies
Former General Electric subsidiaries
1892 establishments in Ontario
Companies based in Mississauga
Manufacturing companies based in Toronto
Canadian companies established in 1892